Lianghe County is located in Dehong Prefecture, Yunnan province, southwest China.

Administrative divisions
Lianghe County has 3 towns, 4 townships and 2 ethnic townships. 
3 towns
 Zhedao
 Mangdong
 Mengyang
4 townships

2 ethnic townships
 Jiubao Achang
 Nangsong Achang

History
Lianghe County was home to one of the Koshanpye Chinese Shan States. It was annexed into China in the early 20th century.

Climate

References

External links
Lianghe County Official Website

County-level divisions of Dehong Prefecture